Stevland Hardaway Morris ( Judkins; May 13, 1950), known professionally as Stevie Wonder, is an American singer-songwriter, who is credited as a pioneer and influence by musicians across a range of genres that include rhythm and blues, pop, soul, gospel, funk, and jazz. A virtual one-man band, Wonder's use of synthesizers and other electronic musical instruments during the 1970s reshaped the conventions of R&B. He also helped drive such genres into the album era, crafting his LPs as cohesive and consistent, in addition to socially conscious statements with complex compositions. Blind since shortly after his birth, Wonder was a child prodigy who signed with Motown's Tamla label at the age of 11, where he was given the professional name Little Stevie Wonder.

Wonder's single "Fingertips" was a No. 1 hit on the Billboard Hot 100 in 1963, at the age of 13, making him the youngest artist ever to top the chart. Wonder's critical success was at its peak in the 1970s. His "classic period" began in 1972 with the releases of Music of My Mind and Talking Book, the latter featuring "Superstition", which is one of the most distinctive and famous examples of the sound of the Hohner Clavinet keyboard. His works Innervisions (1973), Fulfillingness' First Finale (1974) and Songs in the Key of Life (1976) all won the Grammy Award for Album of the Year, making him the tied-record holder for the most Album of the Year wins, with three. He is also the only artist to have won the award with three consecutive album releases. Wonder began his "commercial period" in the 1980s; he achieved his biggest hits and highest level of fame, had increased album sales, charity participation, high-profile collaborations (including Paul McCartney and Michael Jackson), political impact, and television appearances. Wonder has continued to remain active in music and political causes.

Wonder is one of the best-selling music artists of all time, with sales of over 100 million records worldwide. He has won 25 Grammy Awards (the most by a solo artist) and one Academy Award (Best Original Song, for the 1984 film The Woman in Red). Wonder has been inducted into the Rhythm and Blues Music Hall of Fame, Rock and Roll Hall of Fame and Songwriters Hall of Fame. He is also noted for his work as an activist for political causes, including his 1980 campaign to make Martin Luther King Jr.'s birthday a federal holiday in the U.S. In 2009, he was named a United Nations Messenger of Peace, and in 2014, he was honored with the Presidential Medal of Freedom.

Early life 
Wonder was born Stevland Hardaway Judkins in Saginaw, Michigan, on May 13, 1950, the third of five children born to Lula Mae Hardaway, and the second of Hardaway's two children with Calvin Judkins.  He was born six weeks premature which, along with the oxygen-rich atmosphere in the hospital incubator, resulted in retinopathy of prematurity, a condition in which the growth of the eyes is aborted and causes the retinas to detach, so he became blind.

When Wonder was four, his mother divorced his father and moved with her three children to Detroit, Michigan, where Wonder sang as a child in a choir at the Whitestone Baptist Church. She later rekindled her relationship with her first child's father (whose surname was also coincidentally Hardaway) and changed her own name back to Lula Hardaway, going on to have two more children.

When Stevie was signed by Motown in 1961, his surname was legally changed to Morris, which (according to Lula Mae Hardaway's authorized biography) was an old family name.  Berry Gordy was responsible for creating the stage name of "Little Stevie Wonder".

He began playing instruments at an early age, including piano, harmonica, and drums. He formed a singing partnership with a friend; calling themselves Stevie and John, they played on street corners and occasionally at parties and dances.

As a child, Wonder attended Fitzgerald Elementary School in Detroit. After his first album was released, The Jazz Soul of Little Stevie (1962), he enrolled in Michigan School for the Blind in Lansing, Michigan.

Career

1961–1969: Singles as a youth 

In 1961, at the age of 11, Wonder sang his own composition, "Lonely Boy", to Ronnie White of the Miracles; White then took Wonder and his mother to an audition at Motown, where CEO Berry Gordy signed Wonder to Motown's Tamla label. Before signing, producer Clarence Paul gave him the name Little Stevie Wonder. Because of Wonder's age, the label drew up a rolling five-year contract in which royalties would be held in trust until Wonder was 21. He and his mother would be paid a weekly stipend to cover their expenses: Wonder received $2.50 per week, and a private tutor was provided when Wonder was on tour.

Wonder was put in the care of producer and songwriter Clarence Paul, and for a year they worked together on two albums. Tribute to Uncle Ray was recorded first, when Wonder was still 11 years old. Mainly covers of Ray Charles's songs, the album included a Wonder and Paul composition, "Sunset". The Jazz Soul of Little Stevie was recorded next, an instrumental album consisting mainly of Paul's compositions, two of which, "Wondering" and "Session Number 112", were co-written with Wonder. Feeling Wonder was now ready, a song, "Mother Thank You", was recorded for release as a single, but then pulled and replaced by the Berry Gordy song "I Call It Pretty Music, But the Old People Call It the Blues" as his début single; released summer 1962, it almost broke into the Billboard 100, spending one week of August at 101. Two follow-up singles, "Little Water Boy" and "Contract on Love",  both had no success, and the two albums, released in reverse order of recording—The Jazz Soul of Little Stevie in September 1962 and Tribute to Uncle Ray in October 1962—also met with little success.

At the end of 1962, when Wonder was 12 years old, he joined the Motortown Revue, touring the "Chitlin' Circuit" of theatres across America that accepted black artists. At the Regal Theater, Chicago, his 20-minute performance was recorded and released in May 1963 as the album Recorded Live: The 12 Year Old Genius. A single, "Fingertips", from the album was also released in May, and became a major hit. The song, featuring a confident and enthusiastic Wonder returning for a spontaneous encore that catches out the replacement bass player, who is heard to call out "What key? What key?", was a No. 1 hit on the Billboard Hot 100 when Wonder was aged 13, making him the youngest artist ever to top the chart. The single was simultaneously No. 1 on the R&B chart, the first time that had occurred. His next few recordings, however, were not successful; his voice was changing as he got older, and some Motown executives were considering cancelling his recording contract. During 1964, Wonder appeared in two films as himself, Muscle Beach Party and Bikini Beach, but these were not successful either. Sylvia Moy persuaded label owner Berry Gordy to give Wonder another chance.

Dropping the "Little" from his name, Moy and Wonder worked together to create the hit "Uptight (Everything's Alright)", and Wonder went on to have a number of other hits during the mid-1960s, including "With a Child's Heart", and "Blowin' in the Wind", a Bob Dylan song, co-sung by his mentor, producer Clarence Paul. He also began to work in the Motown songwriting department, composing songs both for himself and his label mates, including "The Tears of a Clown", a No. 1 hit for Smokey Robinson and the Miracles (it was first released in 1967, mostly unnoticed as the last track of their Make It Happen LP, but eventually became a major success when re-released as a single in 1970, which prompted Robinson to reconsider his intention of leaving the group).

In 1968, he recorded an album of instrumental soul/jazz tracks, mostly harmonica solos, under the title Eivets Rednow, which is "Stevie Wonder" spelled backward. The album failed to get much attention, and its only single, a cover of Burt Bacharach's and Hal David's "Alfie", only reached number 66 on the U.S. Pop charts and number 11 on the US Adult Contemporary charts. Nonetheless, he managed to score several hits between 1968 and 1970 such as "I Was Made to Love Her", "For Once in My Life" and "Signed, Sealed, Delivered I'm Yours". A number of Wonder's early hits, including "My Cherie Amour", "I Was Made to Love Her", and "Uptight (Everything's Alright)", were co-written with Henry Cosby. The hit single "Signed, Sealed, Delivered I'm Yours" was his first-ever self-produced song.

In 1969, Wonder participated in the Sanremo Music Festival with the song "Se tu ragazza mia", in conjunction with Gabriella Ferri. Between 1967 and 1970, he recorded four 45 rpm singles and an Italian LP.

Wonder's appearance at the 1969 Harlem Cultural Festival opens the 2021 music documentary, Summer of Soul. Wonder plays a drum solo during his set.

1970–1979: Classic albums period 

In September 1970, at the age of 20, Wonder married Syreeta Wright, a songwriter and former Motown secretary. Wright and Wonder worked together on the next album, Where I'm Coming From (1971), Wonder writing the music, and Wright helping with the lyrics. Around this time, Wonder became interested in utilizing synthesizers after hearing albums by electronic group Tonto's Expanding Head Band. Wonder and Wright wanted to "touch on the social problems of the world", and for the lyrics "to mean something". The album was released at around the same time as Marvin Gaye's What's Going On. As both albums had similar ambitions and themes, they have been compared; in a contemporaneous review by Vince Aletti in Rolling Stone, Gaye's was seen as successful, while Wonder's was seen as failing due to "self-indulgent and cluttered" production, "undistinguished" and "pretentious" lyrics, and an overall lack of unity and flow. Also in 1970, Wonder co-wrote, and played numerous instruments on the hit "It's a Shame" for fellow Motown act the Spinners. His contribution was meant to be a showcase of his talent and thus a weapon in his ongoing negotiations with Gordy about creative autonomy. Reaching his 21st birthday on May 13, 1971, Wonder allowed his Motown contract to expire.

During this period, he independently recorded two albums and signed a new contract with Motown Records. The 120-page contract was a precedent at Motown and gave Wonder a much higher royalty rate. He returned to Motown in March 1972 with Music of My Mind. Unlike most previous albums on Motown, which usually consisted of a collection of singles, B-sides and covers, Music of My Mind was a full-length artistic statement with songs flowing together thematically. Wonder's lyrics dealt with social, political, and mystical themes as well as standard romantic ones, while musically he began exploring overdubbing and recording most of the instrumental parts himself. Music of My Mind marked the beginning of a long collaboration with Tonto's Expanding Head Band (Robert Margouleff and Malcolm Cecil), and with lyricist Yvonne Wright.

Released in late 1972, Wonder's album Talking Book featured the No. 1 hit "Superstition", which is one of the most distinctive and famous examples of the sound of the Hohner Clavinet keyboard. Talking Book also featured "You Are the Sunshine of My Life", which also peaked at No. 1. During the same time as the album's release, Wonder began touring with the Rolling Stones to alleviate the negative effects from pigeonholing as a result of being an R&B artist in America. Wonder's touring with the Stones was also a factor behind the success of both "Superstition" and "You Are the Sunshine of My Life". Between them, the two songs won three Grammy Awards. On an episode of the children's television show Sesame Street that aired in April 1973, Wonder and his band performed "Superstition", as well as an original called "Sesame Street Song", which demonstrated his abilities with television.

Innervisions, released in 1973, featured "Higher Ground" (No. 4 on the pop charts) as well as the trenchant "Living for the City" (No. 8). Both songs reached No. 1 on the R&B charts. Popular ballads such as "Golden Lady" and "All in Love Is Fair" were also present, in a mixture of moods that nevertheless held together as a unified whole. Innervisions generated three more Grammy Awards, including Album of the Year. The album is ranked No. 34 on Rolling Stone's 500 Greatest Albums of All Time.  Wonder had become the most influential and acclaimed black musician of the early 1970s.

On August 6, 1973, Wonder was injured in a serious automobile accident while on tour in North Carolina, when a car in which he was riding hit the back of a truck. This left him in a coma for four days and resulted in a partial loss of his sense of smell and a temporary loss of sense of taste. Despite orders from his doctor to refrain from performing, Wonder performed at a homecoming benefit for Shaw University in Raleigh in November 1973. Shaw was facing financial difficulties, so Wonder, who was a member of the university's board of trustees, rallied other acts such as Exuma, LaBelle, and the Chambers Brothers to join the concert, which raised over $10,000 for the school's scholarship fund.

Wonder embarked on a European tour in early 1974, performing at the Midem convention in Cannes, at the Rainbow Theatre in London, and on the German television show Musikladen. On his return from Europe, he played a sold-out concert at Madison Square Garden in March 1974, highlighting both up-tempo material and long, building improvisations on mid-tempo songs such as "Living for the City". The album Fulfillingness' First Finale appeared in July 1974 and set two hits high on the pop charts: the No. 1 "You Haven't Done Nothin'" and the Top Ten "Boogie on Reggae Woman". The Album of the Year was again one of three Grammys won.

The same year, Wonder took part in a Los Angeles jam session with ex-Beatles John Lennon and Paul McCartney, that would become known as the bootleg album A Toot and a Snore in '74. He also co-wrote and produced the 1974 Syreeta Wright album Stevie Wonder Presents: Syreeta.

On October 4, 1975, Wonder performed at the historic "Wonder Dream Concert" in Kingston, Jamaica, a benefit for the Jamaican Institute for the Blind. In 1975, he played harmonica on two tracks on Billy Preston's album It's My Pleasure.

By 1975, at the age of 25, Wonder had won two consecutive Grammy Awards: in 1974 for Innervisions and in 1975 for Fulfillingness' First Finale. In 1976, when Paul Simon won the Album of the Year Grammy for his Still Crazy After All These Years, he wryly noted, "I'd like to thank Stevie Wonder, who didn't make an album this year."

The double album-with-extra-EP, Songs in the Key of Life, was released in September 1976. Sprawling in style and sometimes lyrically difficult to fathom, the album was hard for some listeners to assimilate, yet is regarded by many as Wonder's crowning achievement and one of the most recognizable and accomplished albums in pop music history. The album became the first by an American artist to debut straight at No. 1 in the Billboard charts, where it stood for 14 non-consecutive weeks. Two tracks became No. 1 Pop/R&B hits: "I Wish" and "Sir Duke". The baby-celebratory "Isn't She Lovely?" was written about his newborn daughter Aisha, while songs such as "Love's in Need of Love Today" and "Village Ghetto Land" reflected a far more pensive mood. Songs in the Key of Life won Album of the Year and two other Grammys. The album ranks 4th on Rolling Stones 500 Greatest Albums of All Time.

Until 1979's Stevie Wonder's Journey Through "The Secret Life of Plants", his only further 1970s release was the retrospective three-disc album Looking Back (1977), an anthology of his early Motown period.

1980–1990: Commercial albums period 
The mainly instrumental soundtrack album Stevie Wonder's Journey Through "The Secret Life of Plants" (1979), was composed using an early music sampler called a Computer Music Melodian. It was also his first digital recording, and one of the earliest popular albums to use the technology, which Wonder used for all subsequent recordings. Wonder toured briefly with an orchestra in support of the album, and used a Fairlight CMI sampler onstage. In this year Wonder also wrote and produced the dance hit "Let's Get Serious", performed by Jermaine Jackson and ranked by Billboard as the No. 1 R&B single of 1980.

Hotter than July (1980) became Wonder's first platinum-selling single album, and its single "Happy Birthday" was a successful vehicle for his campaign to establish Dr. Martin Luther King Jr.'s birthday as a national holiday. The album also included "Master Blaster (Jammin')", "I Ain't Gonna Stand for It", and the sentimental ballad, "Lately".

In 1982, Wonder released a retrospective of his 1970s work with Stevie Wonder's Original Musiquarium, which included four new songs: the ten-minute funk classic "Do I Do" (which featured Dizzy Gillespie), "That Girl" (one of the year's biggest singles to chart on the R&B side), "Front Line", a narrative about a soldier in the Vietnam War that Wonder wrote and sang in the first person, and "Ribbon in the Sky", one of his many classic compositions. He also gained a No. 1 hit that year in collaboration with Paul McCartney in their paean to racial harmony, "Ebony and Ivory".

In 1983, Wonder performed the song "Stay Gold", the theme to Francis Ford Coppola's film adaptation of S. E. Hinton's novel The Outsiders. Wonder wrote the lyrics. In 1983, he scheduled an album to be entitled People Work, Human Play. The album never surfaced and instead 1984 saw the release of Wonder's soundtrack album for The Woman in Red. The lead single, "I Just Called to Say I Love You", was a No. 1 pop and R&B hit in both the United States and the United Kingdom, where it was placed 13th in the list of best-selling singles in the UK published in 2002. It went on to win an Academy award for best song in 1985. Wonder accepted the award in the name of Nelson Mandela and was subsequently banned from all South African radio by the Government of South Africa.

Incidentally, on the occasion of his 35th birthday, Stevie Wonder was honored by the United Nations Special Committee Against Apartheid for his stance against racism in South Africa that same year (1985). The album also featured a guest appearance by Dionne Warwick, singing the duet "It's You" with Stevie and a few songs of her own. Following the success of the album and its lead single, Wonder made an appearance on The Cosby Show, in the episode "A Touch of Wonder", where he demonstrated his ability to sample.

The following year's In Square Circle featured the No. 1 pop hit "Part-Time Lover". The album also has a Top 10 Hit with "Go Home". It also featured the ballad "Overjoyed", which was originally written for Journey Through "The Secret Life of Plants", but did not make the album. He performed "Overjoyed" on Saturday Night Live when he was the host. He was also featured in Chaka Khan's cover of Prince's "I Feel For You", alongside Melle Mel, playing his signature harmonica. In roughly the same period he was also featured on harmonica on Eurythmics' single, "There Must Be an Angel (Playing with My Heart)" and Elton John's "I Guess That's Why They Call It the Blues".

Wonder was in a featured duet with Bruce Springsteen on the all-star charity single for African Famine Relief, "We Are the World", and he was part of another charity single the following year (1986), the AIDS-inspired "That's What Friends Are For". He played harmonica on the album Dreamland Express by John Denver in the song "If Ever", a song Wonder co-wrote with Stephanie Andrews; wrote the track "I Do Love You" for the Beach Boys' 1985 self-titled album; and played harmonica on "Can't Help Lovin' That Man" on The Broadway Album by Barbra Streisand.

In 1987, Wonder appeared on Michael Jackson's Bad album, on the duet "Just Good Friends". Jackson also sang a duet with him entitled "Get It" on Wonder's 1987 album Characters. This was a minor hit single, as were "Skeletons" and "You Will Know". Wonder played harmonica on a remake of his own song, "Have a Talk with God" (from Songs in the Key of Life in 1976), on Jon Gibson's album Body & Soul (1989).

1991–1999: Jungle Fever and 1996 Olympics 

In the 1990s, Wonder continued to release new material, but at a slower pace. He recorded a soundtrack album for Spike Lee's film Jungle Fever in 1991. From this album, singles and videos were released for "Gotta Have You", "Fun Day" (remix only), "These Three Words" and "Jungle Fever". The B-side to the "Gotta Have You" single was "Feeding Off The Love of the Land", which was played during the end credits of the movie Jungle Fever but was not included on the soundtrack. A piano and vocal version of "Feeding Off The Love of the Land" was also released on the Nobody's Child: Romanian Angel Appeal compilation. Conversation Peace and the live album Natural Wonder were released in the 1990s.

In 1992, Wonder went to perform at Panafest, a new international festival of music held biennially in Ghana; it was during this trip that he composed many of the songs featured on Conversation Peace, and he would describe in a 1995 interview the powerful impact his visit to that country had: "I'd only been there for 18 hours when I decided I'd eventually move there permanently." In 1994, as co-chair of Panafest that year, he headlined a concert at the National Theatre in Accra.

Among his other activities, Wonder played harmonica on one track for the 1994 tribute album Kiss My Ass: Classic Kiss Regrooved; sang at the 1996 Summer Olympics closing ceremony; collaborated in 1997 with Babyface on "How Come, How Long", a song about domestic violence that was nominated for a Grammy award; and played harmonica on Sting's 1999 "Brand New Day". In early 1999, Wonder performed in the Super Bowl XXXIII halftime show.

In May 1999, Rutgers University presented Wonder with an honorary doctorate degree in fine arts. In December 1999, Wonder announced that he was interested in pursuing an intraocular retinal prosthesis to partially restore his sight.

2000–present: Later career and collaborations 
Into the 21st century, Wonder contributed two new songs to the soundtrack for Spike Lee's Bamboozled album ("Misrepresented People" and "Some Years Ago"). Wonder continues to record and perform; though mainly occasional appearances and guest performances, he did do two tours, and released one album of new material, 2005's A Time to Love. In June 2006, Wonder made a guest appearance on Busta Rhymes' album The Big Bang, on the track "Been through the Storm". He sings the refrain and plays the piano on the Dr. Dre- and Sha Money XL–produced track. He appeared again on the last track of Snoop Dogg's album Tha Blue Carpet Treatment, "Conversations". The song is a remake of "Have a Talk with God" from Songs in the Key of Life. In 2006, Wonder staged a duet with Andrea Bocelli on the latter's album Amore, offering harmonica and additional vocals on "Canzoni Stonate". Wonder also performed at Washington, D.C.'s 2006 "A Capitol Fourth" celebration.  His key appearances include performing at the opening ceremony of the 2002 Winter Paralympics in Salt Lake City, the 2005 Live 8 concert in Philadelphia, the pre-game show for Super Bowl XL in 2006, the Obama Inaugural Celebration in 2009, and the opening ceremony of the 2011 Special Olympics World Summer Games in Athens, Greece.

Wonder's first new album in ten years, A Time to Love, was released in October 2005 to lower sales than previous albums, and lukewarm reviews—most reviewers appearing frustrated at the end of the long delay to get an album that mainly copied the style of Wonder's "classic period" without doing anything new. The first single, "So What the Fuss", was released in April. A second single, "From the Bottom of My Heart", was a hit on adult-contemporary R&B radio. The album also featured a duet with India Arie on the title track "A Time to Love".

Wonder did a 13-date tour of North America in 2007, starting in San Diego on August 23; this was his first U.S. tour in more than 10 years. On September 8, 2008, he started the European leg of his Wonder Summer's Night Tour, the first time he had toured Europe in over a decade. His opening show was at the National Indoor Arena in Birmingham in the English Midlands. During the tour, he played eight UK gigs; four at the O2 Arena in London (filmed in HD and subsequently released as a live-in-concert release on DVD and Blu-Ray, Live At Last), two in Birmingham and two at the M.E.N. Arena in Manchester.

Wonder's other stop in the tour's European leg also found him performing in the Netherlands (Rotterdam), Sweden (Stockholm), Germany (Cologne, Mannheim and Munich), Norway (Hamar), France (Paris), Italy (Milan) and Denmark (Aalborg). Wonder also toured Australia (Perth, Adelaide, Melbourne, Sydney and Brisbane) and New Zealand (Christchurch, Auckland and New Plymouth) in October and November. His 2010 tour included a two-hour set at the Bonnaroo Music Festival in Manchester, Tennessee, a stop at London's Hard Rock Calling in Hyde Park, and appearances at England's Glastonbury Festival, Rotterdam's North Sea Jazz Festival, and a concert in Bergen, Norway, and a concert in Dublin, Ireland, at the O2 Arena on June 24.

Wonder's harmonica playing can be heard on the 2009 Grammy-nominated "Never Give You Up", featuring CJ Hilton and Raphael Saadiq.

Wonder sang at the Michael Jackson memorial service in 2009, at Etta James' funeral, in 2012, a month later at Whitney Houston's memorial service, and at the funeral of Aretha Franklin in 2018.

Wonder appeared on singer Celine Dion's studio album Loved Me Back to Life, performing a cover of his 1985 song "Overjoyed". The album was released in October 2013. He was also featured on two tracks on Mark Ronson's 2015 album Uptown Special.

In October 2020, Wonder announced that he had a new vanity label released via Republic Records, So What the Fuss Records, marking the first time his music was not released through Motown Records. The announcement was paired with the release of two singles: "Can't Put It in the Hands of Fate", a "socially-conscious" funk track, and "Where Is Our Love Song", whose proceeds will go towards the organization Feeding America.

In June of 2021, Wonder appeared in the documentary Summer of Soul, directed by Ahmir "Questlove" Thompson, showing the Harlem Cultural Festival of 1969. In never before seen footage, a young 19 year old Stevie Wonder is seen performing in front of thousands of people in Harlem. Wonder's performance shown in the documentary included “It’s Your Thing” by The Isley Brothers and a drum solo. Wonder talks about the turning point made in his career during this time and how this helped him get out of being seen as just a child star.

In October of 2022, Wonder celebrated his 50th anniversary of his project Talking Book. After 50 years the album is still being recognized for its timeless hits such as the No. 1 hit "Superstition" and "You Are the Sunshine of My Life".

Future projects 
By June 2008, Wonder was working on two projects simultaneously: a new album called The Gospel Inspired by Lula, which will deal with the various spiritual and cultural crises facing the world, and Through the Eyes of Wonder, an album he has described as a performance piece that will reflect his experience as a blind man. Wonder was also keeping the door open for a collaboration with Tony Bennett and Quincy Jones concerning a rumored jazz album. If Wonder were to join forces with Bennett, it would not be for the first time: their rendition of "For Once in My Life" earned them a Grammy for best pop collaboration with vocals in 2006.

In 2013, Wonder revealed that he had been recording new material for two albums, When the World Began and Ten Billion Hearts, in collaboration with producer David Foster, to be released in 2014. The albums have not seen release.

In October 2020, while promoting his two recent singles, Wonder mentioned both Through the Eyes of Wonder and The Gospel Inspired by Lula as projects in development (the former as an album that may feature both singles, and the latter as a future album he may record with his former label Motown).

Legacy 

Wonder is one of the most notable popular music figures of the second half of the 20th century. He is one of the most successful songwriters and musicians. Virtually a one-man band during his peak years, his use of synthesizers and further electronic musical instruments during the 1970s helped expand the sound of R&B. He is also credited as one of the artists who helped drive R&B into the album era, by crafting his LPs as cohesive, consistent statements with complex sounds. His "classic period", which culminated in 1976, was marked by his funky keyboard style, personal control of production, and use of integrated series of songs to make concept albums. In 1979, Wonder used Computer Music Inc.'s early music sampler, the Melodian, on his soundtrack album Stevie Wonder's Journey Through "The Secret Life of Plants". This was his first digital recording and one of the earliest popular albums to use the technology, which Wonder used for all subsequent recordings.

He recorded several critically acclaimed albums and hit singles, and also wrote and produced songs for many of his label mates and outside artists as well. In his childhood, he was best known for his harmonica work, but today he is better known for his keyboard skills and vocal ability. He also plays the piano, synthesizer, harmonica, congas, drums, bongos, organ, melodica and Clavinet. Wonder has been credited as a pioneer and influence to musicians of various genres including pop, rhythm and blues, soul, funk and rock.

Wonder's "classic period" is generally agreed to be between 1972 and 1976. Some observers see aspects of 1971's Where I'm Coming From as certain indications of the beginning of Wonder's "classic period", such as its new funky keyboard style that Wonder used throughout the classic period. Some determine Wonder's first "classic" album to be 1972's Music of My Mind, on which he attained personal control of production, and on which he programmed a series of songs integrated with one another to make a concept album. Others skip over early 1972 and determine the beginning of the classic period to be in late 1972 with Talking Book, the album on which Wonder "hit his stride".

Wonder's albums during his "classic period" were considered very influential in the music world: the 1983 Rolling Stone Record Guide said they "pioneered stylistic approaches that helped to determine the shape of pop music for the next decade"; In 2005, American recording artist Kanye West said of his own work: "I'm not trying to compete with what's out there now. I'm really trying to compete with Innervisions and Songs in the Key of Life. It sounds musically blasphemous to say something like that, but why not set that as your bar?" Slate magazine's pop critic, Jack Hamilton, said: "Most Americans follow up their 21st birthdays with a hangover; Stevie Wonder opted for arguably the greatest sustained run of creativity in the history of popular music. Wonder's "classic period"—the polite phrase for when Stevie spent five years ferociously dunking on the entire history of popular music with the releases of Music of My Mind, Talking Book, Innervisions, Fulfillingness' First Finale, and Songs in the Key of Life [...] We've never heard anything like it since, and barring another reincarnation, we never will again."

Wonder has recorded more than 30 U.S. top-ten hits, including ten U.S. number-one hits on the pop charts, well as 20 R&B number one hits. He has sold over 100 million records, 19.5 million of which are albums; he is one of the top 60 best-selling music artists with combined sales of singles and albums. Wonder was the first Motown artist and second African-American musician to win an Academy Award for Best Original Song, which he won for his 1984 hit single "I Just Called to Say I Love You" from the movie The Woman in Red. Wonder won 25 Grammy Awards (the most ever won by a solo artist), as well as a Lifetime Achievement Award. His albums of the "classic period", Innervisions (1973), Fulfillingness' First Finale (1974) and Songs in the Key of Life (1976), all won the Grammy Award for Album of the Year, making him the tied-record holder for the most Album of the Year wins, with three. He is also the only artist to have won the award with three consecutive album releases. He has been inducted into the Rhythm and Blues Music Hall of Fame, Rock and Rock Hall of Fame and Songwriters Hall of Fame, and has received a star on the Hollywood Walk of Fame. He has also been awarded the Polar Music Prize. Rolling Stone named him the ninth greatest singer and fifteenth greatest artist of all time. In June 2009, he became the fourth artist to receive the Montreal Jazz Festival Spirit Award.

In 2003, Rolling Stones "500 Greatest Albums of All Time" list included Innervisions at number 23, Songs in the Key of Life at number 56, Talking Book at number 90, and Music of My Mind at number 284.  In 2004, on their "500 Greatest Songs of All Time" list, Rolling Stone included "Superstition" at number 74, "Living for the City" at number 104, "Higher Ground" at number 261, and "You Are the Sunshine of My Life" at number 281.

Wonder is also noted for his work as an activist for political causes, including his 1980 campaign to make Martin Luther King Jr.'s birthday a federal holiday in the United States. On October 21, 1974, with the Boston busing desegregation underway, Wonder spoke and led students in song at a lounge at the University of Massachusetts Boston the day after he performed at the Boston Garden.

Personal life

Marriages and children 
Wonder has been married three times. He was married to Motown singer-songwriter and frequent collaborator Syreeta Wright from 1970 until their amicable divorce in 1972. From 2001 until 2012 he was married to fashion designer Kai Millard. In October 2009, Wonder and Millard separated; Wonder filed for divorce in August 2012. In 2017 he married Tomeeka Bracy.

Wonder has nine children with five women. Wonder's first child's name is not publicly known. They were born to Yolanda Simmons, whom Wonder met when she applied for a job as secretary for his publishing company. Simmons gave birth to Wonder's daughter Aisha Morris on February 2, 1975. After Aisha was born, Wonder said "she was the one thing that I needed in my life and in my music for a long time". Aisha was the inspiration for Wonder's hit single "Isn't She Lovely?" She is now a singer who has toured with her father and accompanied him on recordings, including his 2005 album A Time to Love. Wonder and Simmons also had a son, Keita, in 1977.

In 1983, Wonder had a son named Mumtaz Morris with Melody McCulley. Wonder also has a daughter, Sophia, and a son, Kwame, with a woman whose identity has not been publicly disclosed. Wonder has two sons with second wife Kai Millard Morris. The elder is named Kailand, and he occasionally performs as a drummer on stage with his father. The younger son, Mandla Kadjay Carl Stevland Morris, was born on May 13, 2005 (his father's 55th birthday).

Wonder's ninth child, his second with Tomeeka Robyn Bracy, was born in December 2014, amid rumors that he would be the father to triplets. This turned out not to be the case, and the couple's new daughter was given the name Nia, meaning "purpose" (one of the seven principles of Kwanzaa).

Family and health 
On May 31, 2006, Wonder's mother Lula Mae Hardaway died in Los Angeles at the age of 76. During his September 8, 2008, UK concert in Birmingham, he spoke of his decision to begin touring again following his loss: "I want to take all the pain that I feel and celebrate and turn it around."

At a concert in London's Hyde Park on July 6, 2019, Wonder announced that he would be undergoing a kidney transplant in September.

Religion and politics 
Wonder was introduced to Transcendental Meditation through his marriage to Syreeta Wright. Consistent with that spiritual vision, Wonder became vegetarian, and later a vegan, singing about it in October 2015 on The Late Late Show with James Corden during the show's "Carpool Karaoke" segment.

Wonder joined Twitter on April 4, 2018, and his first tweet was a five-minute video honoring Martin Luther King Jr. Dozens of famous personalities were rounded up in the video, which was titled "The Dream Still Lives". Each person involved shared their dream, calling back to King's popular speech in 1963. Wonder's first tweet took the Internet by storm, and he also encouraged viewers to share their own videos about their dreams with the hashtag #DreamStillLives.

Wonder has been a longtime Baptist affiliated with black churches.

On August 31, 2018, Wonder performed at the funeral of Aretha Franklin at Detroit's Greater Grace Temple. He closed the ceremony with a rendition of the Lord's Prayer and his song "As".

Awards and recognition

Grammy Awards 
Wonder has won 25 Grammy Awards, as well as a Grammy Lifetime Achievement Award in 1996. He is one of only four artists and groups who have won the Grammy for Album of the Year three times as the main credited artist, along with Frank Sinatra, Paul Simon, and Taylor Swift. Wonder is the only artist to have won the award with three consecutive album releases.

|-
| rowspan="2"|1967
| rowspan="2"|"Uptight"
| Best Rhythm & Blues Recording
| 
|-
| Best Rhythm & Blues Solo Vocal Performance, Male or Female
| 
|-
| 1969
| "For Once in My Life"
| Best Rhythm & Blues Vocal Performance, Male
| 
|-
| rowspan="2"|1971
| rowspan="2"|"Signed, Sealed, Delivered I'm Yours"
| Best Rhythm & Blues Song
| 
|-
| rowspan="3"|Best R&B Vocal Performance, Male
| 
|-
| 1972
| "We Can Work It Out"
| 
|-
|rowspan="6"|1974
| rowspan="2"|"Superstition"
| 
|-
| Best Rhythm & Blues Song
| 
|-
| rowspan="3"|"You Are the Sunshine of My Life"
| Best Pop Vocal Performance, Male
| 
|-
| Record of the Year
| 
|-
| Song of the Year
| 
|-
| Innervisions
| rowspan="2"|Album of the Year
| 
|-
|rowspan="6"|1975
| rowspan="2"|Fulfillingness' First Finale
|
|-
| Best Pop Vocal Performance, Male
| 
|-
| "Boogie On Reggae Woman"
| Best R&B Vocal Performance, Male
| 
|-
| "Living for the City"
| rowspan="2"|Best Rhythm & Blues Song
| 
|-
| "Tell Me Something Good"
| 
|-
| rowspan="2"|Stevie Wonder
| rowspan="2"|Best Producer of the Year
| 
|-
|rowspan="7"|1977
|
|-
| rowspan="2"|"Contusion"
| Best Pop Instrumental Performance
| 
|-
| Best Instrumental Composition
|
|-
| "Have A Talk With God"
| Best Inspirational Performance
| 
|-
| rowspan="2"|Songs in the Key of Life
| Album of the Year
|
|-
| Best Pop Vocal Performance, Male
|
|-
| "I Wish"
| rowspan="2"|Best R&B Vocal Performance, Male
| 
|-
|rowspan="4"|1981
| "Master Blaster (Jammin')"
|
|-
| Stevie Wonder's Journey Through The Secret Life Of Plants
| Best Album of Original Score Written for a Motion Picture or a Television Special
|
|-
| Stevie Wonder
| Producer of the Year (Non-Classical)
| 
|-
| "Let's Get Serious"
| rowspan="3"|Best Rhythm & Blues Song
|
|-
|rowspan="7"|1983
| "That Girl"
| 
|-
| rowspan="3"|"Do I Do"
|
|-
| Best R&B Vocal Performance, Male
|
|-
| Best Instrumental Arrangement Accompanying Vocal(s)
|
|-
| rowspan="2"|"Ebony and Ivory"
| Record of the Year
| 
|-
| Best Pop Performance by a Duo or Group with Vocal
| 
|-
| "What's That You're Doing"
| Best R&B Performance by a Duo or Group with Vocal
|
|-
|rowspan="4"|1985
| rowspan="2"|"I Just Called to Say I Love You"
| Song of the Year
|
|-
| Best Pop Vocal Performance, Male
|
|-
| "I Just Called to Say I Love You (Instrumental)"
| Best Pop Instrumental Performance
|
|-
| The Woman In Red
| rowspan="2"|Best R&B Vocal Performance, Male
|
|-
|rowspan="2"|1986
| In Square Circle
|
|-
| "Part-Time Lover"
| Best Pop Vocal Performance, Male
|
|-
| rowspan="2"|1987
| rowspan="2"|"That's What Friends Are For"
| Best Pop Performance by a Duo or Group with Vocal
| 
|-
| Record of the Year
| 
|-
| rowspan="2"|1988
| rowspan="2"|"Skeletons"
| Best Rhythm & Blues Song
|
|-
| rowspan="3"|Best R&B Vocal Performance, Male
| 
|-
| 1989
| Characters
| 
|-
| rowspan="3"|1992
| rowspan="2"|"Gotta Have You"
| 
|-
| rowspan="2"|Best Song Written Specifically for a Motion Picture or for Television
| 
|-
| "Jungle Fever"
| 
|-
| rowspan="2"|1996
| rowspan="2"|"For Your Love"
| Best Male R&B Vocal Performance
| 
|-
| Best Rhythm & Blues Song
| 
|-
| 1997
| "Kiss Lonely Goodbye (Harmonica with Orchestra)"
| Best Pop Instrumental Performance
| 
|-
| rowspan="2"|1998
| rowspan="2"|"How Come, How Long"
| Best Short Form Music Video
| 
|-
| rowspan="2"|Best Pop Collaboration with Vocals
| 
|-
| rowspan="3"|1999
| "How Come, How Long" (Live)
| 
|-
| rowspan="2"|"St. Louis Blues"
| Best Male R&B Vocal Performance
| 
|-
| Best Instrumental Arrangement Accompanying Vocal(s)
| 
|-
| rowspan="2"|2003
| "Love's In Need Of Love Today"
| Best R&B Performance by a Duo or Group with Vocal
| 
|-
| "Christmas Song"
| rowspan="3"|Best Pop Collaboration with Vocals
| 
|-
| 2005
| "Moon River"
| 
|-
| rowspan="6"|2006
| "A Time To Love"
| 
|-
| A Time To Love
| Best R&B Album
| 
|-
| "So What the Fuss"
| Best Male R&B Vocal Performance
| 
|-
| "How Will I Know"
| rowspan="2"|Best R&B Performance by a Duo or Group with Vocals
| 
|-
| "So Amazing"
| 
|-
| "From The Bottom Of My Heart"
| Best Male Pop Vocal Performance
| 
|-
| 2007
| "For Once in My Life"
| Best Pop Collaboration with Vocals
| 
|-
| 2009
| "Never Give You Up"
| Best R&B Performance by a Duo or Group with Vocals
| 
|-
| 2010
| "All About the Love Again"
| Best Male Pop Vocal Performance
|

Other awards and recognition 
Wonder has been given a range of awards, both for his music and for his civil rights work, including a Lifetime Achievement Award from the National Civil Rights Museum, being named one of the United Nations Messengers of Peace, and earning a Presidential Medal of Freedom from President Barack Obama in 2014, presented at a ceremony in the White House on November 24 that year.

In December 2016, the City of Detroit recognized Wonder's legacy by renaming a portion of his childhood street, Milwaukee Avenue West, between Woodward Avenue and Brush Street, as "Stevie Wonder Avenue". He was also awarded an honorary key to the city, presented by Mayor Mike Duggan.

Honorary degrees 
Stevie Wonder has received many honorary degrees in recognition of his music career. These include:

Discography

See also 
 List of Billboard Hot 100 chart achievements and milestones
 List of artists who reached number one on the Hot 100 (U.S.)

References

External links 

 
 
 
 
Stevie Wonder Interview NAMM Oral History Library (2016)

 
1950 births
21st-century American keyboardists
21st-century multi-instrumentalists
African-American male composers
African-American male singer-songwriters
African-American record producers
Activists for African-American civil rights
American child singers
American tenors
American harmonica players
African-American pianists
American male organists
American rhythm and blues keyboardists
American rhythm and blues singers
American funk keyboardists
American funk singers
American multi-instrumentalists
American rhythm and blues singer-songwriters
American soul keyboardists
American soul singers
Record producers from Michigan
Best Original Song Academy Award-winning songwriters
Blind musicians
American blind people
Blind singers
Child pop musicians
Commandeurs of the Ordre des Arts et des Lettres
Gershwin Prize recipients
Golden Globe Award-winning musicians
Grammy Award winners
Grammy Lifetime Achievement Award winners
Kennedy Center honorees
Living people
Motown artists
Musicians from Detroit
Musicians from Saginaw, Michigan
Presidential Medal of Freedom recipients
Rhythm and blues drummers
Rhythm and blues pianists
United Nations Messengers of Peace
American male pianists
21st-century organists
20th-century American keyboardists
Universal Motown Records artists
20th-century African-American male singers
21st-century African-American male singers
Singer-songwriters from Michigan